Borrelia parkeri, a species of Borrelia, has been associated with relapsing fever.

References

parkeri